Usha Mehta (25 March 1920 – 11 August 2000) was a Gandhian and freedom fighter of India. She is also remembered for organizing the Congress Radio, also called the Secret Congress Radio, an underground radio station, which functioned for few months during the Quit India Movement of 1942. In 1998, the Government of India conferred on her Padma Vibhushan, the second highest civilian award of Republic of India.

Early life
Usha Mehta was born in Saras, a village near Surat in modern-day Gujarat. When she was just five years old, Usha first saw Gandhi while on a visit to his ashram at Ahmedabad. Shortly afterwards, Gandhi arranged a camp near her village in which little Usha participated, attending sessions and doing a little spinning.

In 1928, eight-year-old Usha participated in a protest march against the Simon Commission and shouted her first words of protest against the British Raj: "Simon Go Back." She and other children participated in early morning protests against the British Raj and picketing in front of liquor shops. During one of these protests marches, the policemen charged the children, and a girl carrying the Indian flag fell down along with the flag. Angry at this incident, the children took the story to their parents. The elders responded by dressing up the children in the colours of the Indian flag (saffron, white and green) and sending them out in the streets a few days later. Dressed in the colours of the flag, the children marched again, shouting: "Policemen, you can wield your sticks and your batons, but you cannot bring down our flag."

Usha's father was a judge under the British Raj. He therefore did not encourage her to participate in the freedom struggle. However, this limitation was removed when her father retired in 1930. In 1932, when Usha was 12, her family moved to Bombay, making it possible for her to participate more actively in the freedom movement. She and other children distributed clandestine bulletins and publications, visited relatives in the prisons, and carried messages to these prisoners.

Usha grew up highly influenced by Gandhi and became one of his followers. She made an early decision to remain celibate for life and took up a spartan, Gandhian lifestyle, wearing only Khādī clothes and keeping away from luxuries of all types. Over time, she emerged as a prominent proponent of Gandhian thought and philosophy.

Usha's initial schooling was in Kheda and Bharuch and then in Chandaramji High School, Bombay. She was an average student. In 1935, her matriculation examinations placed her among the top 25 students in her class. She continued her education at Wilson College, Bombay, graduating in 1939 with a first-class degree in philosophy. She also began studying law, but ended her studies in 1942 to join the Quit India Movement. Thereafter, beginning at age 22, she participated in the freedom movement full-time.

Role in freedom struggle
Gandhi and the Congress had announced that the Quit India Movement would commence on 9 August 1942 with a rally at Gowalia Tank grounds in Mumbai. Nearly all leaders including Gandhi were arrested before that date. However, a vast crowd of Indians gathered at Gowalia Tank Ground on the appointed day. It was left to a group of junior leaders and workers to address them and hoist the national flag.

On 14 August 1942, Usha and some of her close associates began the Secret Congress Radio, a clandestine radio station. It went air on 27 August. The first words broadcast in her voice were: "This is the Congress radio calling on [a wavelength of] 42.34 meters from somewhere in India." Her associates included Vithalbhai Jhaveri, Chandrakant Jhaveri, Babubhai Thakkar and Nanka Motwani, owner of Chicago Radio, who supplied equipment and provided technicians. Many other leaders, including Dr. Ram Manohar Lohia, Achyutrao Patwardhan and Purushottam Trikamdas, also assisted the Secret Congress Radio. The radio broadcast recorded messages from Gandhi and other prominent leaders across India. To elude the authorities, the organizers moved the station's location almost daily. Ultimately, however, the police found them on 12 November 1942 and arrested the organizers, including Usha Mehta. All were later imprisoned.

The Criminal Investigation Department (CID), a wing of the Indian Police, interrogated her for six months. During this time, she was held in solitary confinement and offered inducements such as the opportunity to study abroad if she would betray the movement. However, she chose to remain silent and, during her trials, asked the Judge of the High Court whether she was required to answer the questions. When the judge confirmed that she was not mandatory, she declared that she would not reply to any of the questions, not even to save herself. After the trial, she was sentenced to four years' imprisonment (1942 to 1946). Two of her associates were also convicted. Usha was imprisoned at Yeravda Jail in Pune. Her health deteriorated and she was sent to Bombay for treatment at Sir J. J. Hospital. In the hospital, three to four policemen kept a round-the-clock watch on her to prevent her from escaping. When her health improved, she was returned to Yeravda Jail. In March 1946, she was released, the first political prisoner to be released in Bombay, at the orders of Morarji Desai, who was at that time the home minister in the interim government.

Although the Secret Congress Radio functioned only for three months, it greatly assisted the movement by disseminating uncensored news and other information banned by the British-controlled government of India. Secret Congress Radio also kept the leaders of the freedom movement in touch with the public. Reminiscing about those days, Usha Mehta described her involvement with the Secret Congress Radio as her "finest moment" and also as her saddest moment, because an Indian technician had betrayed them to the authorities.

Post-independence
After her incarceration, Usha's failing health prevented her from participating in politics or social work. The day India gained independence, Usha Mehta was confined to bed and could not attend the official function in New Delhi. She later re-commenced her education and wrote a doctoral dissertation on the political and social thought of Gandhi, earning a PhD from the University of Bombay. She had a long association with Mumbai university in many capacities: as a student, as a research assistant, as a lecturer, a professor, and finally as the head of the department of civics and politics. She retired from the University of Bombay in 1980.

Even after India's independence, Usha continued to be socially active, particularly in spreading the Gandhian thought and philosophy. Over the years. she authored many articles, essays, and books in English and Gujarati, her mother tongue. She was elected the president of Gandhi Smarak Nidhi, a trust dedicated to the preservation of Gandhian heritage. The Nidhi acquired Mani Bhavan in Mumbai, residence of Sardar Patel's daughter Manibehn Patel, where Gandhi used to reside during his visits to the city and converted it into a Gandhi memorial. She was the president of Gandhi Peace Foundation, New Delhi. She also actively participated in the affairs of Bharatiya Vidya Bhavan. The Government of India associated her with a number of celebrations of India's 50th anniversary of freedom.

The Union of India conferred on her Padma Vibhushan in 1998, the second highest civilian award of India.

Later years
With time, Usha grew increasingly unhappy with the developments taking place in the social, political, and economic spheres of independent India. Once, in an interview to India Today, she expressed her feelings in these words: "Certainly this is not the freedom we fought for." She added that the freedom fighters of her generation felt that "once people were ensconced in positions of power, the rot would set in." However, in her words, "we didn’t know the rot would sink in so soon." Nevertheless, she did not deny the achievements of free India since the independence: "India has survived as a democracy and even built a good industrial base," she said. "Still, it is not the India of our dreams".

In August 2000, although she was suffering from fever, Usha participated like she did every year in the anniversary celebrations related to the Quit India Movement in August Kranti Maidan. She returned home weak and exhausted. Two days later, she died peacefully on 11 August 2000 at the age of 80, survived by her elder brother and three nephews. One of her nephews, Ketan Mehta, a noted Bollywood filmmaker. The other nephew is Dr Yatin Mehta, a well-known anaesthetist who was formerly the Director of Escorts Hospital and is associated with Medicity in Gurgaon now. The third nephew is Dr Nirad Mehta, who joined the Army and is now at P.D. Hinduja National Hospital, Mumbai.

See also
 Indian independence movement

References

Further reading
India’s 50 Most Illustrious Women by Indra Gupta

External links
Dr. Usha Mehta

Indian independence activists from Gujarat
1920 births
2000 deaths
Women educators from Gujarat
Educators from Gujarat
Recipients of the Padma Vibhushan in social work
Gandhians
Prisoners and detainees of British India
Women Indian independence activists
People from Surat district
20th-century Indian educational theorists
Social workers
20th-century Indian women
Social workers from Gujarat
20th-century women educators